Devil's Night is a name associated with October 30, the night before Halloween. It is related to the "Mischief Night" practiced in parts of the United States such as Philadelphia but is chiefly associated with the serious vandalism and arson seen in Detroit, Michigan, from the late 1960s to the 1990s, finally prompting the "Angels' Night" community response.

Description
Devil's Night made its way to Detroit in the 1930s and 1940s. Traditionally, city youths engaged in a night of mischievous or petty criminal behavior, usually consisting of minor pranks or acts of mild vandalism (such as egging, soaping or waxing windows and doors, leaving rotten vegetables or flaming bags of canine feces on stoops, or toilet papering trees and shrubs) which caused little or no property damage.  By the 1970’s, the concept of Devil’s Night as a phenomenon of a night of mischief and vandalism had spread, in a limited way, to cities around the state of Michigan, around the Midwest, and, in some instances, a few other cities around the country.

However, in Detroit in the early 1970s, the vandalism escalated to more destructive acts such as arson. This primarily took place in the inner city, but surrounding suburbs were often affected as well.

The crimes became more destructive in Detroit's inner-city neighborhoods, and included hundreds of acts of arson and vandalism every year. The destruction was worst in the mid- to late-1980s, with more than 800 fires set in 1984, and a number in the hundreds for each subsequent year until 2011.

Decline of Devil's Night arson
Devil's Night arson in Detroit had not declined by the early 1990s. After a brutal Devil's Night in 1994, mayor Dennis Archer promised city residents arson would not be tolerated.  In 1995, Detroit city officials organized and established Angels' Night on and around October 29–31.  Each year as many as 50,000 volunteers gather to patrol neighborhoods in the city. Many volunteers kept a high profile, patrolling neighborhoods with magnetic-mount flashing amber beacons on their personal vehicles, along with communicating with command centers via CB radios or by cellular phones to report any suspicious activity. Incidences of arson and other crimes declined, a success largely attributed to the Angels' Night volunteers. The drop in reported fires for the year 2008 was credited to the Angels' Night program. That same year, 35,000 signed up to volunteer in the city, according to Daniel Cherrin, spokesperson for Detroit Mayor Ken Cockrel, Jr.

As a result of the efforts, the number of fires decreased to near-ordinary levels in the first decade of the 21st century. In 2010, the number of reported fires increased to 169, a 42 percent increase compared to the previous year. However, subsequent years saw the totals again decline to the low 90s for the three-day period. This average of about 32 fires per day is somewhat higher than the expected 26 fires per day through the year. 2015 saw the lowest recorded number of fires with only 52 fires recorded and only 24 considered possibly arson. 

By the end of the 2010s, the destructive elements of Devil's Night in Detroit had largely ceased to exist. In 2018, formal support of Angels' Night was ended with city resources being instead allocated to host neighborhood Halloween parties. Devil's Night 2018 recorded a total of five structure fires, with only four on the night before. Devil's Night 2021 saw the lowest totals in multiple decades, with only three structure fires recorded.

In the 2010s, the decline of Devil's Night fires coincided with an increase in similar arson on the nights surrounding the July 4 Independence Day holiday.

In popular culture
 In 1993, underground Detroit rapper Esham released his song "Devil's Night", about arson and mayhem in the city.

 Devil's Night is an integral part of the 1994 film The Crow. At a meeting of criminal underworld figures, the main villain Top Dollar (Michael Wincott) is portrayed as having started the first fires himself, which were later emulated by others.
 Detroit hip-hop group D12's 2001 debut album is titled Devil's Night which also features a song with the same title.
 "Devil's Night" is the title of the sixth episode in the sixth season of Criminal Minds. In the episode, the FBI's Behavioral Analysis Unit (BAU) is called to Detroit to help catch a serial killer who burns people alive once per year in the days leading up to Devil's Night.
 "Devil's Night" is the title of a song from gothic metalcore band Motionless in White's album Infamous.
 "Devil's Night" is the title of the fourth episode of American Horror Story: Hotel, which is the fifth season of the series. It allowed the ghosts of former serial killers like Aileen Wuornos, Jeffrey Dahmer, John Wayne Gacy, and Richard Ramirez to return to the Hotel Cortez for a mischievous night.
 "Devil's Night" is the title for the second episode of the third season of Scream, as the events in the episode take place the night before Halloween.
 In the 1997 film Grosse Pointe Blank, Debbie (Minnie Driver) refers to the reason why she is living with her father is because her apartment was burned on Devil's Night.
 An episode of Flint Town called "Devil's Night" focuses on arson in Flint.
 Multiple underground rappers came together every year from 2003–2009 to make Halloween-themed albums called "Devilz Nite".

See also

 Decline of Detroit
 List of practical joke topics
 Nain Rouge
 Mischief Night

References

Further reading
 Chafets, Ze'ev. (1990). Devil's Night and Other True Tales of Detroit. New York: Random House. .
 Davis, Adam Brooke. "Devil's Night and Hallowe'en: The Linked Fates of Two Folk Festivals" . Missouri Folklore Society Journal XXIV(2002) 69–82

External links
 Official City of Detroit Angels Night Webpage
 Angels' Night web site

1960s in Detroit
1970s in Detroit
1980s in Detroit
1990s in Detroit
Traditions involving fire
Culture of Detroit
Halloween
Halloween in the United States
October observances
Riots and civil disorder in Detroit
Civil crime prevention
Arson in Michigan